Chalcedony (or  ) is a cryptocrystalline form of silica, composed of very fine intergrowths of quartz and moganite. These are both silica minerals, but they differ in that quartz has a trigonal crystal structure, while moganite is monoclinic. Chalcedony's standard chemical structure (based on the chemical structure of quartz) is SiO2 (silicon dioxide).

Chalcedony has a waxy luster, and may be semitransparent or translucent. It can assume a wide range of colors, but those most commonly seen are white to gray, grayish-blue or a shade of brown ranging from pale to nearly black. The color of chalcedony sold commercially is often enhanced by dyeing or heating.

The name chalcedony comes from the Latin chalcedonius (alternatively spelled calchedonius) and is probably derived from the town of Chalcedon in Turkey. The name appears in Pliny the Elder's Naturalis Historia as a term for a translucent kind of jaspis.  Another reference to a gem by the name of khalkedon is found in the Book of Revelation (21:19); however, it is a hapax legomenon found nowhere else in the Bible, so it is hard to tell whether the precious gem mentioned in Revelation is the same as the mineral known by this name today. The term plasma is sometimes used to refer to green translucent chalcedony.

Varieties 

Chalcedony occurs in a wide range of varieties. Many semi-precious gemstones are in fact forms of chalcedony. The more notable varieties of chalcedony are as follows:

Agate

Agate is a variety of chalcedony characterized by either transparency or color patterns, such as multi-colored curved or angular banding. Opaque varieties are sometimes referred to as jasper.  Fire agate shows iridescent phenomena on a brown background; iris agate shows exceptional iridescence when light (especially pinpointed light) is shone through the stone. Landscape agate is chalcedony with a number of different mineral impurities making the stone resemble landscapes.

Carnelian

Carnelian (also spelled cornelian) is a clear-to-translucent reddish-brown variety of chalcedony. Its hue may vary from a pale orange to an intense almost-black coloration.  Similar to carnelian is sard, which is brown rather than red.

Chrysoprase

Chrysoprase (also spelled chrysophrase) is a green variety of chalcedony, which has been colored by nickel oxide. (The darker varieties of chrysoprase are also referred to as prase. However, the term prase is also used to describe green quartz and to a certain extent is a color-descriptor, rather than a rigorously defined mineral variety.)

Blue-colored chalcedony is sometimes referred to as "blue chrysoprase" if the color is sufficiently rich, though it derives its color from the presence of copper and is largely unrelated to nickel-bearing chrysoprase.

Fire Agate 

Fire agate is a variety of botryoidal chalcedony which contains layered microscopic particles of iron that cause an iridescent effect. It can display a wide range of iridescent colors including red, orange, yellow, green, blue, and purple.

Heliotrope

Heliotrope is a green variety of chalcedony, containing red inclusions of iron oxide that resemble drops of blood, giving heliotrope its alternative name of bloodstone. In a similar variety, the spots are yellow instead, known as plasma.

Moss agate

Moss agate contains green filament-like inclusions, giving it the superficial appearance of moss or blue cheese. There is also tree agate which is similar to moss agate except it is solid white with green filaments whereas moss agate usually has a transparent background, so the "moss" appears in 3D. It is not a true form of agate, as it lacks agate's defining feature of concentric banding.

Chrome chalcedony

Chrome chalcedony is a green variety of chalcedony, which is colored by chromium compounds.  It is also known as "mtorolite" when found in Zimbabwe and "chiquitanita" when found in Bolivia.

Onyx

Onyx is a variant of agate with black and white banding. Similarly, agate with brown, orange, red and white banding is known as sardonyx.

Chalcedony Ice-blue

In Greenland, white to greyish chalcedony is known from volcanic strata of the Paleocene, in the Disko-Nuussuaq area (West Greenland) and from the Scoresby Sound area (East Greenland). A light blue variety of chalcedony is known from Illorsuit, formed in the volcanic rocks along the southern coast of the island. Because of its bluish, ice-like colour, it has the local name Chalcedony Ice-blue.

History 

Chalcedony was used in tool making as early as 32,000 BP in Central Australia where archaeological studies at sites in the Cleland Hills uncovered flakes from stone brought in from quarries many kilometres away. Pre-contact uses described in the twentieth century included ceremonial stone knives.

In the Bronze Age chalcedony was in use in the Mediterranean region; for example, on Minoan Crete at the Palace of Knossos, chalcedony seals have been recovered dating to circa 1800 BC. People living along the Central Asian trade routes used various forms of chalcedony, including carnelian, to carve intaglios, ring bezels (the upper faceted portion of a gem projecting from the ring setting), and beads that show strong Greco-Roman influence.

Fine examples of first century objects made from chalcedony, possibly Kushan, were found in recent years at Tillya-tepe in north-western Afghanistan. Hot wax would not stick to it so it was often used to make seal impressions.
The term chalcedony is derived from the name of the ancient Greek town Chalkedon in Asia Minor, in modern English usually spelled Chalcedon, today the Kadıköy district of Istanbul.

According to tradition, at least three varieties of chalcedony were used in the Jewish High Priest's Breastplate. (Jewish tradition states that Moses' brother Aaron wore the Breastplate, with inscribed gems representing the twelve tribes of Israel). The Breastplate supposedly included jasper, chrysoprase and sardonyx, and there is some debate as to whether other agates were also used.

In the 19th century, Idar-Oberstein, Germany, became the world's largest chalcedony processing center, working mostly on agates. Most of these agates were from Latin America, in particular Brazil. Originally the agate carving industry around Idar and Oberstein was driven by local deposits that were mined in the 15th century. Several factors contributed to the re-emergence of Idar-Oberstein as agate center of the world: ships brought agate nodules back as ballast, thus providing extremely cheap transport.  In addition, cheap labor and a superior knowledge of chemistry allowed them to dye the agates in any color with processes that were kept secret. Each mill in Idar-Oberstein had four or five grindstones. These were of red sandstone, obtained from Zweibrücken; and two men ordinarily worked together at the same stone.

Geochemistry

Structure
Chalcedony was once thought to be a fibrous variety of cryptocrystalline quartz.  More recently however, it has been shown to also contain a monoclinic polymorph of quartz, known as moganite.  The fraction, by mass, of moganite within a typical chalcedony sample may vary from less than 5% to over 20%.  The existence of moganite was once regarded as dubious, but it is now officially recognised by the International Mineralogical Association.

Solubility
Chalcedony is more soluble than quartz under low-temperature conditions, despite the two minerals being chemically identical. This is thought to be because chalcedony is extremely finely grained (cryptocrystalline), and so has a very high surface area to volume ratio.   It has also been suggested that the higher solubility is due to the moganite component.

Solubility of quartz and chalcedony in pure water
This table gives equilibrium concentrations of total dissolved silicon as calculated by PHREEQC (PH REdox EQuilibrium (in C language, USGS)) using the llnl.dat database.

See also 

 List of minerals
 Moganite

References

External links

Mindat: mineralogical data Chalcedony
USGS: US Chalcedony locations

 
Lithics
Trigonal minerals